Audrey Cooper (born 1977) is an American journalist.  Hearst Corporation named her as Editor in Chief of the San Francisco Chronicle on January 13, 2015, making her the first woman to hold this position.

Before Cooper's appointment, there were only two women Editors in Chief working at America's top 25 circulation daily newspapers, Newsday Debbie Henley and Nancy Barnes of the Houston Chronicle.

Cooper was born in Topeka, Kansas, and grew up in the Kansas City, Kansas, area. She graduated magna cum laude with a BA in Journalism and Political Science from Boston University in 1999. She worked as a journalist at the Tri-Valley Herald, the Associated Press, and the Stockton Record, all in Northern California.  She joined the Chronicle in 2006 as an assistant metro editor, rising to replace Stephen Proctor as managing editor in May 2013. She left the Chronicle effective June 20, 2020.

She was named Editor-in-Chief at WNYC Public Radio effective July 20, 2020. Her hire was criticized by newsroom staff who had requested someone local who was a person of color with radio experience. Her early tenure was also marked with conflict with her staff, layoffs, and terminations. In May 2021, their union, SAG-AFTRA, filed a complaint with the National Labor Relations Board against New York Public Radio, over Cooper's actions along with other labor issues that preceded her hire. The two groups settled in February 2022, agreeing to increase employee wage and benefits and extend employee protections against retaliation.

References

Living people
1977 births
American women journalists
American newspaper editors
San Francisco Chronicle people
Boston University alumni
People from the Kansas City metropolitan area
Women newspaper editors
21st-century American women